Ignacio 'Nacho' Cases Mora (born 22 December 1987) is a Spanish professional footballer who plays as a central midfielder.

He spent most of his career with Sporting de Gijón, appearing in 183 competitive games over the course of four La Liga seasons (seven in total).

Club career

Sporting
Born in Gijón, Asturias, Cases was a product of Sporting de Gijón's prolific youth academy, Mareo. He made it to the B team during the 2005–06 season, with them playing in the fourth division. Although he proved instrumental in helping to achieve promotion two years later, he struggled for a place in the starting line-ups in the following years.

A skilled midfielder, it was not until the 2010–11 campaign, at the age of 23 years – and acting as captain with the reserves – that Cases was finally given his chance to make his first-team debut, starting in a 1–1 away draw against Racing de Santander on 9 January 2011. On 2 April, he assisted Miguel de las Cuevas in the 79th minute of a 1–0 win over Real Madrid at the Santiago Bernabéu Stadium, thus ending José Mourinho's nine-year unbeaten home league record. He finished his first season as a professional with 18 La Liga appearances, in an escape from relegation.

AEK Larnaca
On 22 June 2017, 29-year-old Cases announced he was leaving Sporting Gijón and bring to an end a 23-year association with the same club. Shortly after, he joined a host of compatriots at Cyprus' AEK Larnaca FC.

Career statistics

Honours
AEK Larnaca
Cypriot Cup: 2017–18
Cypriot Super Cup: 2018

References

External links
Sporting Gijón official profile 

1987 births
Living people
Spanish footballers
Footballers from Gijón
Association football midfielders
La Liga players
Segunda División players
Segunda División B players
Tercera División players
Sporting de Gijón B players
Sporting de Gijón players
Cypriot First Division players
AEK Larnaca FC players
Super League Greece players
Volos N.F.C. players
A Lyga players
FK Sūduva Marijampolė players
Spanish expatriate footballers
Expatriate footballers in Cyprus
Expatriate footballers in Greece
Expatriate footballers in Lithuania
Spanish expatriate sportspeople in Cyprus
Spanish expatriate sportspeople in Greece
Spanish expatriate sportspeople in Lithuania